Chorvila is a village located in western Georgia, Imereti Region.

Notable people
 Bidzina Ivanishvili (1956–), businessman and politician who was Prime Minister of Georgia from 2012 to 2013
 Nodar Tsereteli (1988–), AKA NodaMixMusic, Blues Musician, hip-hop producer, founder and CEO at NodaMixProductions.

See also
 Imereti

Geography of Georgia (country)
Populated places in Sachkhere Municipality